Megastomia sulcifera is a species of sea snail, a marine gastropod mollusk in the family Pyramidellidae, the pyrams and their allies. It was originally identified as Odostomia sulcifera by E.A. Smith in 1872.

References

External links
 To World Register of Marine Species

Pyramidellidae
Gastropods described in 1871